The Tabnit sarcophagus is the sarcophagus of the Phoenician King of Sidon Tabnit I (ruled c. 549–539 BC), the father of King Eshmunazar II. The sarcophagus is decorated with two separate and unrelated inscriptions – one in Egyptian hieroglyphics and one in Phoenician script. The latter contains a curse for those who open the tomb, promising impotency and loss of an afterlife. It was created in the early 5th century BC, and was unearthed in 1887 by Osman Hamdi Bey at the Ayaa Necropolis east of Sidon together with the Alexander Sarcophagus and other related sarcophagi. Tabnit's body was found floating perfectly preserved in the original embalming fluid. Both the sarcophagus and Tabnit's decomposed skeleton are now in the Istanbul Archaeology Museums.

The sarcophagus, together with the Eshmunazar II sarcophagus, were possibly acquired by the Sidonians following their participation in the Battle of Pelusium (525 BC), and served as models for later Phoenician sarcophagi. The Phoenician text is considered to have a "remarkable" similarity to that of the Shebna inscription from Jerusalem.

Discovery
At the beginning of 1887, Mehmed Sherif Effendi, the owner of a piece of land known as Ayaa, obtained a permit from the local authorities to quarry stone for the construction of a new building. On 2 March 1887, Cherif reported to the Kaymakam of Sidon, Sadik Bey, that he had discovered a well at the bottom of which there might be tombs. Sadik Bey examined the site and spotted a vault containing two sarcophagi through a hole in the eastern wall of the well. He escalated the matter to the Vali of Damascus, Rashid Nashid Pasha, and the Governor of Beirut Nassouhi Bey, and entrusted the well to the care of Essad Effendi from the gendarmerie of Sidon.

According to the American missionary narrative, the tombs were discovered in 1887 by the American Presbyterian minister William King Eddy (the father of William A. Eddy). William Wright sent a letter to The Times with news of Eddy's discovery and imploring the British Museum to "take immediate measures to secure these treasures and prevent their falling into the hands of the vandal Turk". This alerted the new curator of the fledgling Istanbul Archaeological Museum, Osman Hamdi Bey, who arranged for a full excavation and the transfer of the sarcophagi to Istanbul.

During the excavation, the workmen opened the Tabnit sarcophagus and found "a human body floating in perfect preservation in a peculiar fluid". Whilst Hamdi Bey was at lunch, the workmen overturned the sarcophagus and poured the fluid out, such that the "secret of the wonderful fluid was again hidden in the Sidon sand". Notably, after the "peculiar fluid" left the sarcophagus, the body started to become un-preservable. Hamdi Bey noted in 1892 that he had kept a portion of the sludge that remained in the bottom of the sarcophagus.

Inscription

The inscription is known as KAI 13. The Egyptian hieroglyphic inscription shows that the sarcophagus was originally intended for an Egyptian general named "Pen-Ptah" (pꜣ-n-pth). Transcribed in equivalent Hebrew letters, the Phoenician text is readable by a modern Hebrew speaker, with a few distinctions: as is customary in Phoenician, the direct object marker is written אית (ʾyt) instead of את (ʾt) in Hebrew, and relative clauses ('which', 'who') are introduced with אש (ʾš) instead of אשר (ʾšr) in Hebrew. Among less common words in modern Hebrew, the inscription uses חרץ for gold (Biblical ‏חָרוּץ) and אר for the verb 'to gather' (אָרוּ 'they gathered', Biblical ‏אָרָה).

Dating

Both the Tabnit sarcophagus and the Eshmunazar II sarcophagus are thought to originally date from the Twenty-sixth Dynasty of Egypt, which had its capital at Sais. This is partially due to their resemblance to similar sarcophagi such as the Psamtik II-era Horkhebit sarcophagus from Saqqara, now in the Metropolitan Museum of Art.

Notes

References

  (editio princeps)
  (Plates)
 
 
 

 
 

5th-century BC works
1887 archaeological discoveries
Phoenician inscriptions
KAI inscriptions
Kings of Sidon
Sarcophagi
Multilingual texts
Phoenician sarcophagi
Archaeological artifacts